The Archaeopteridaceae are an extinct family of plants belonging to Progymnospermae, and were dominant forest trees of the Late Devonian.

References

Middle Devonian plants
Prehistoric plant families
Late Devonian plants
Middle Devonian first appearances
Late Devonian extinctions